In the summer of 1991, continuous, heavy rainfall in Eastern China caused rivers and water loggings to overflow and flood the area, leading to the Chinese government requesting international aid.

Background
Large amounts of rainfall beginning on 18 May quickly led areas of eastern China to begin overflowing with water; however, flooding reports in the area had begun to be officially addressed around late June. Specifically, the Huai, Chu, and Yangtze rivers are credited with the main flooding that resulted in the Anhui, Jiangsu, and Henan provinces taking the most damage. The Chinese government initially sent out soldiers and troops to help with evacuation and flood relief efforts, but with the number of homes and acres of crops destroyed increasing steadily, the Chinese government turned to other countries, requesting for aid in flood relief.

On September 3, 1991, the UN Department of Human Affairs (now known as the United Nations Office for the Coordination of Humanitarian Affairs) announced that the death toll was 556 in the Anhui province, 260 in the Jiangsu province, and 94 in the Henan province. In late January of the next year, the New York Times reported that the death toll was approximately 3,000.

References

1991
1991 floods in Asia
1991 disasters in China
May 1991 events in Asia
June 1991 events in Asia
July 1991 events in Asia
History of Anhui
History of Jiangsu
History of Henan